Amy Taubin (born September 10, 1938) is an American author and film critic. She is a contributing editor for two prominent film magazines, the British Sight & Sound and the American Film Comment. She has also written regularly for The Village Voice, The Millennium Film Journal, and Artforum, and used to be curator of video and film at the non-profit experimental performance space The Kitchen.

Taubin attended Sarah Lawrence College as an undergrad and received an MA from New York University. Taubin is also a filmmaker, curator, and educator. She is one of the people visible in Michael Snow's experimental film Wavelength.

Taubin has served on the board of trustees of the Anthology Film Archives; She was named as a Distinguished Art Historian-Teacher at the New York School of Visual Arts, Department of Humanities and Sciences; and has served on the selection committee for the Film Society of Lincoln Center.

In 2020, Taubin was awarded a writer grant, in the short-form writing category, by the Warhol Foundation. In her statement on receiving the prize, she said she planned to use the funds to survey the '"time machine of cinema available on our home screens."'

Selected works

Books 

 Ghosts in the Machine, Village Voice, 1998.
 Douglas Gordon: through a looking glass, co-authored with Gagosian Gallery, Hal Hartle and Kay C. Pallister, Gagosian Gallery, 1999.
 Taxi Driver, BFI Publishing, 2nd ed., 2012.
 James Nares, co-authored with Glenn O'Brien and Ed Halter, Rizzoli International, 2014.
 The complete films of Agnès Varda, co-authored Michael Koresky, Ginette Vincendeau, So Mayer, etal., (The book is part of a 15-disc Blu-Ray collection) The Criterion Collection, 2020.

Articles 
 "So there, Orwell": 1984: a video review, co-authored with John Howell, Louisiana World Exposition, 1984.
 Stands by his man on Peter Fonda's The hired man, Artform international, October 2003.
 Eastern exposure on recent Asian cinema, Artform international, November 2004.
 Common sense, Film comment, Vol. 52, no. 6, November/December 2016.

References

1938 births
Living people
American film critics
National Society of Film Critics Members
The Village Voice people
American women film critics
20th-century American journalists
American women non-fiction writers
20th-century American women
21st-century American women